Brody is a given name and a surname of either Jewish or British origin, which may also be spelled Brodie. An unrelated name Bródy is found in Hungary and Polish.

Notable people with the name include:

Surname

Brody 
 Adam Brody (born 1979), American actor
 Adrien Brody (born 1973), American actor
 Alan Brody, American writer
 Alexander Brody (disambiguation), several people
 Ann Brody (1884–1944), American actress
 David Brody (journalist) (born 1965), American television reporter and author
 David Brody (historian) (born 1930), American historian
 Dean Brody (born 1975), Canadian country music singer
 Dylan Brody (born 1964), American writer
 Elaine Brody (1922–2014), American gerontologist and sociologist
 Florian Brody (born 1953), Austrian-American digital media creator, inventor, writer, public speaker, academic, and global business consultant
Frances Brody, English novelist and playwright also writing as Frances McNeil
 Francine Brody (born 1969), British/American actress
 Gene Brody (born 1950), American psychologist
 Howard Brody (born 1949), American bioethicist
 Jane Brody (born 1941), American journalist
 Joseph Brody (disambiguation), several people
 Lane Brody (born 1955), American singer-songwriter
 Leola Brody (1922–1997), All-American Girls Professional Baseball League player
 Leonard Brody (born 1971), Canadian writer
 Morton A. Brody (1933–2000), American judge
 Nathan Brody, American psychologist
 Neville Brody (born 1957), British graphic designer
 Sam Brody (1907–1987), American film director
 Steven Brody (1919 or 1926–1994), American jewelry designer
 Tal Brody (born 1943), American-born Israeli basketball player
 Thomas Brody (disambiguation), several people
 William R. Brody (born 1944), American radiologist and university president
 Brody L. Crook

Bródy 

Bródy is a Hungarian surname. The "ó" is a long o [o:] in Hungarian, and the "y" indicates a "from": "from Bród". This surname is also associated with the Ukrainian city of Brody.
 Henrik Bródy (1868–1942), Hungarian rabbi and writer
 Imre Bródy (1891–1944), Hungarian physicist
 János Bródy (born 1946), Hungarian singer, lyricist and songwriter
 Michael Brody (born 1954), Hungarian linguist
 Sándor Bródy (footballer) (1884–1944), Hungarian footballer
 Sándor Bródy (writer) (1863–1924), Hungarian writer
 T. Peter Brody (1920–2011), British-naturalised Hungarian physicist
 Zsigmond Bródy (1840–1906), Hungarian journalist

Given name
 Brody Bishop (born 1984), Canadian basketball player
 Brody Dalle (born 1979), Australian musician
 Brody Hutzler (born 1971), American actor
 Brody Jenner (born 1983), American actor and television personality
 Brody Malone (born 2000), American artistic gymnast
 Brody Stevens (born Steven Brody, 1970–2019), American comedian and actor

Fictional characters
Jessica Brody, in the television series Homeland
 Brody Davis, in the television series Roswell
 James Brody, in the television series SeaQuest DSV
 Jason Brody, protagonist of the 2012 video game Far Cry 3 
 Joe Brody, in the novel The Big Sleep and in its adaptation in the films made in 1946 and 1978 
 Marcus Brody, in the Indiana Jones films
 Martin Brody, in the films Jaws and Jaws 2, played by Roy Scheider
 Matt Brody, in the television series Baywatch
 Morgan Brody, in the television series CSI: Crime Scene Investigation
 Nicholas Brody, in the television series Homeland
 Brody Romero, in the television series Power Rangers Ninja Steel
 Brody, in the animated television series The Ridonculous Race
 Brody, playable character in the mobile game Mobile Legends: Bang Bang

See also
 Brodie
 Broderick
 Brodsky
 Brady (surname)
 Brady (given name)

References

Ukrainian-language surnames